Bruno Faidutti (born 23 October 1961) is a historian and sociologist, living in France, who is best known as a board game designer.

Early life and education
Bruno Faidutti studied law, economics, and sociology, eventually earning a doctorate in History by writing about the scientific debate in the Renaissance on the reality of the unicorn. His favorite authors are Thomas Pynchon, James Joyce, Marcel Proust, Salman Rushdie, and Umberto Eco, his favorite movie, Andrei Tarkovsky's Andrei Roublev. He came into the world of hobby gaming through Cosmic Encounter and roleplaying games, and was one of the first French Dungeons & Dragons players.

Career

Bruno Faidutti has created and published over 40 board and card games. His best known games include Knightmare Chess (1991) and Citadels (2000), as well as Mystery of the Abbey (1993, 2003). He is also involved in the boardgaming community with his "Ideal Games Library" website and personal "Game of the Year" prize. Many of his games are the results of collaboration with other designers.

In the United States, his Eurogame Corruption was released by Atlas Games in 1999. His Citadels was released in 2000 by Fantasy Flight Games, who later released his game Red November in 2008.

Selected list of games
Knightmare Chess, 1991 (with Pierre Cléquin)
Citadels, 2000
Castle, 2000 (with  Serge Laget)
Dragon's Gold, 2001
China Moon, 2003
Mystery of the Abbey, 2003 (with  Serge Laget)
Queen's Necklace, 2003 (with Bruno Cathala)
Key Largo, 2005 (with Paul Randles and Mike Selinker)
Diamant (aka Incan Gold), 2005 (with Alan R. Moon)
Ad Astra, 2009 (with  Serge Laget)
Mascarade, 2013
Warehouse 51, 2015
Raptor, 2015, (with Bruno Cathala)
Waka Tanka, 2016
HMS Dolores, 2016, (with Eric M. Lang)

References

External links
 Bruno Faidutti's website
 
 An article about Bruno Faidutti's design style

Board game designers
Chess variant inventors
Living people
1961 births
French sociologists
Atlas Games people
French male writers
French game designers